Bob Hope (1903–2003) was a British-born American iconic entertainer.

Bob Hope may also refer to:
 Bob Hope (Emmerdale), a character in Emmerdale, played by Tony Audenshaw
 USNS Bob Hope, the lead vessel of the Bob Hope-class ships

See also
 The Adventures of Bob Hope, a comic book series
 Bob Hope British Classic, a former European Tour golf tournament played from 1980 to 1991
 Bob Hope Chrysler Classic, a tournament of the PGA tour 
 Bob Hope Humanitarian Award, an award given by the Academy of Television Arts and Sciences
 Bob Hope Presents the Chrysler Theatre, a television series on NBC from 1963 to 1967
 Bobby Hope, Scottish footballer
 Hollywood-Burbank Airport or Bob Hope Airport
 Burbank Airport–South station or Bob Hope Airport Train Station
 Robert Hope (disambiguation)